Flip Phone Fantasy is the second studio album by Australian nu metal band Ocean Grove. it was released on 13 March 2020 through UNFD Records. Their first single "Ask for the Anthem" was released on 6 February 2019. The second single "JUNKIE$" was released on 28 October 2019. The third single "Sunny" was released on 12 December 2019, while the music video for the single was released on 20 January 2020. The fourth single "NEO" was released on 11 February 2020. The fifth single "Thousand Golden People" was released on 27 February 2020 along with the announcement of the album's release date. It is the first album to not feature Luke Holmes on vocals and Jimmy Hall on guitar, and the first album to feature Twiggy Hunter on bass and vocals with Dale Tanner switching to lead vocals; this can be heard on the album in a shift away from their previous hardcore punk influenced releases, as Flip Phone Fantasy takes more influence from rap metal and alternative rock, featuring far less screaming than their previous work.

Critical reception

Flip Phone Fantasy received critical acclaim upon release. Kel Burch of Depth Mag was overwhelmingly positive about the album, giving it a perfect score of 10 and stating "Whether it’s in the fire of 'Neo', the dark trancey world of 'Guys from the Gord', the whispered intoxication of 'Baby Cobra', the heartfelt balladry of 'Freaks', or the bouncy singalongs of 'Ask for the Anthem', Flip Phone Fantasy brilliantly expresses the heart and soul of Ocean Grove. The band embody the importance of individuality and to look to the heart instead of assume a prescribed or expected image. Flip Phone Fantasy is a fitting tribute to that, and a breathtaking adventure to be with." Tom Valcanis of Hysteria Magazine also gave album a perfect score of 10 and stating "Ocean Grove starved for this album, they bled for this album. Flip Phone Fantasy is that union of imagination, time, and sound manifest. Go decorate some well earned moments with it. You’ll be glad you did."

Track listing
Note: All track titles are stylised in all caps.

Personnel
Credits are adapted from the album's liner notes.

 Dale Tanner – lead vocals
 Twiggy Hunter – bass, vocals, lead vocals on "NEO" and "Baby Cobra"
 Matthew Henley – guitars
 Sam Bassal – drums, production, engineered, mastering, mixing
 Running Touch – samples, vocals, lead vocals on "Sway"

Charts

References

2020 albums
Ocean Grove (Australian band) albums
UNFD albums